Francis may refer to:

People
Pope Francis, the head of the Catholic Church and sovereign of the Vatican City State and Bishop of Rome
Francis (given name), including a list of people and fictional characters
Francis (surname)

Places
Rural Municipality of Francis No. 127, Saskatchewan, Canada
Francis, Saskatchewan, Canada
Francis (electoral district)
Francis, Nebraska
Francis Township, Holt County, Nebraska
Francis, Oklahoma
Francis, Utah

Other uses
Francis (film), the first of a series of comedies featuring Francis the Talking Mule, voiced by Chill Wills
Francis, a 1983 play by Julian Mitchell
FRANCIS, a bibliographic database
Francis (1793), a colonial schooner in Australia
Francis turbine, a type of water turbine
Francis (band), a Sweden-based folk band
 Francis, a character played by YouTuber Boogie2988

See also
Saint Francis (disambiguation)
Francies, a surname, including a list of people with the name
Francisco (disambiguation)
Franciscus, a given name, including a list of people with the name
Francesco, a given name, including a list of people with the name